The following is a list of awards and nominations received by actor Alan Rickman. The list includes 35 nominations and 11 wins.

Major Awards

British Academy Film Awards (BAFTA)

Drama Desk Award

Golden Globe Awards

Laurence Olivier Awards

Primetime Emmy Awards

Screen Actors Guild Awards

Tony Awards

Critics Awards

Broadcast Film Critics Association Award

Alliance of Women Film Journalists

Washington D.C. Area Film Critics Association Awards

Phoenix Film Critics Society Awards

San Diego Film Critics Society Awards

St. Louis Gateway Film Critics Association Awards

Other Awards

Audie Awards

People's Choice Award

Montreal World Film Festival

MTV Movie Awards

Satellite Awards

Saturn Awards

Scream Awards

References

Rickman, Alan